The 2016 Fótbolti.net Cup was the 6th season of Iceland's annual pre-season tournament. The tournament involved eight clubs from the top two leagues in Iceland, Úrvalsdeild karla and 1. deild, and used a combination of group and knockout rounds to determine each team's final position in the competition. The tournament began on 8 January 2016 and concluded on 3 February 2016.

ÍBV won the competition after they defeated KR 2–1 in the final on 1 February 2016.

Groups

Group A

Matches

Group B

Matches

Knockout phase

Seventh place

Fifth place

Third place

Final

References

External links
 Results
 Results

Fotbolti